Rajiv Gandhi College of Engineering (RGCE) is an Engineering college in 	Nemili, Sriperumbudur, Tamil Nadu, India.

History
Rajiv Gandhi College of Engineering commenced its educational program in 2001 with three branches viz; ECE, CSE and It on a vast expanse of 30 acres of land in Sriperumbudur, Tamil Nadu with the approval from AICTE and affiliation from Anna University, Chennai.

RGCE is the first self-financing college in Tamil Nadu to introduce BE (Biomedical Engineering) in the year 2002 and the first in introducing B.Tech (Petroleum Engineering) in South India, with technical support from ONGC and Aban Offshore Ltd.

References

External links
 

Engineering colleges in Tamil Nadu
Colleges affiliated to Anna University
Universities and colleges in Kanchipuram district
Educational institutions established in 2001
2001 establishments in Tamil Nadu